A change management analyst is responsible for auditing and evaluating the change management process in the context of Systems engineering  (not to be confused with organizational Change management).

Change management within systems engineering is aimed at helping system users to adopt the new system and use it productively. The role of the change management analyst includes ensuring that adequate documentation and support are available to the users.

In 2006, this position was described by the National Weather Service (USA) as follows:
The [change management analyst's] responsibilities include: analyzing the (request for change) prior to distributing it for review processing, obtaining all missing data, scheduling and providing secretarial assistance (agendas and minutes) to the [configuration control board] and (program management committee) meetings, maintaining the current status of (request for changes) including action items, maintaining charters and Terms of Reference (TOR), and coordinating the (request for change) appeals process.

Notes and references

Business occupations